Intracellular hyaluronan-binding protein 4 is a protein that in humans is encoded by the HABP4 gene.

References

Further reading